Tula Rud-e Pain (also Romanized as Ţūlā Rūd-e Pā’īn; also known as Tulari and Ţūlā Rūd) is a village in Tula Rud Rural District, in the Central District of Talesh County, Gilan Province, Iran. At the 2006 census, its population was 413, in 82 families.

References 

Populated places in Talesh County